A builder's plate is usually a metal plate that is attached to railway locomotives and rolling stock, bogies, construction equipment, trucks, automobiles, large household appliances, bridges, ships and more. It gives such information as the name of the manufacturer, the place and country of manufacture, the model number, the serial number, as well as the date of manufacture or date of fabrication of the item or unit.

Gallery

See also 

 Engine number
 Head badge
 Nameplate
 Railroadiana
 VRP
 VIN

Citations 
 

Identifiers
Infographics
Signage
Locomotive parts